Lombe is a town in Angola in Malanje Province.

Namesakes 

There are other towns with this name in Cuanza Sul Province and Zaire Province.

Transport 

Lombe is served by a station on the Luanda Railways.

See also 

 Railway stations in Angola

References 

Populated places in Malanje Province